"Why Stop Now" is a song by American rapper Busta Rhymes, released November 16, 2011, as a Promotional single. The song, produced by Sak Pase, features fellow American singer Chris Brown. Busta Rhymes uses his signature fast-paced rapping in all three verses, over production that contains elements of techno music. Chris Brown raps the chorus with aggression. The song was released after his last single "Stop the Party" which featured American rapper and record producer Swizz Beatz.  The song was released as a free launch exclusive for Google Music, and is only available digitally through that marketplace.

Remix
The official remix features Chris Brown, Lil Wayne, and Missy Elliott was released on February 15, 2012.

Chart performance

References 

Busta Rhymes songs
Chris Brown songs
Cash Money Records singles
2011 singles
Music videos directed by Hype Williams
Songs written by Busta Rhymes
Songs written by Chris Brown
2011 songs